Walter Steward of Dundonald (died 1246) was 3rd hereditary High Steward of Scotland and Justiciar of Scotia.

He was the eldest son of Alan fitz Walter, 2nd High Steward of Scotland but which wife of Alan's was his mother is not clear. He was the first member of the House of Stuart to use Stewart as a surname, and was designated "of Dundonald".

He witnessed a charter by King Alexander II, under the designation of "Walterus filius Alani, Senescallus, Justiciar Scotiae" and it may be that seal which Nisbet described pertaining to Walter Hereditary High Steward of Scotland. Around the seal it states "Sigill. Walteri filii Allani".

Family
Walter married Bethóc, daughter of Gille Críst, Earl of Angus by his wife, Marjorie, youngest daughter of Henry of Scotland, 3rd Earl of Huntingdon and his wife, Ada de Warenne. 

They were parents of:

Alexander Stewart, 4th High Steward of Scotland, sometime Regent of Scotland.
Sir Robert, of Tarbolten and Crookston, and Lord of Darnley.
John, killed at Damietta in 1249, Egypt during the Seventh Crusade.
Walter Bailloch ("the Freckled"), who married Mary de Menteith and became Earl of Menteith.
William,
Beatrix, married Maol Domhnaich, Earl of Lennox.
Christian,
Eupheme, married Adam Wallace, Laird of Riccarton. 
Margaret, married her cousin Niall, Earl of Carrick.
Sybella, married Colin Fitzgerald, 1st Lord of Kintail.

References

Bibliography
 Burke, Sir Bernard, Ulster King of Arms, Dormant, Abeyant, Forfeited, and Extinct Peerages, London, 1883, p. 606.
 Clay, John W., FSA., editor, The Visitation of Cambridge, 1575 and 1619 by Henery St.George, Richmond Herald, Harleian Society, London, 1897, pps: 7 - 11.
 Lauder-Frost, Gregory, F.S.A.Scot., "East Anglian Stewarts" in The Scottish Genealogist, Dec.2004, vol.LI, no.4., pps:151-161. ISSN 0330-337X
 Mackenzie, A. M., MA., D.Litt., The Rise of the Stewarts, London, 1935, pps.10-11.
 Miller, James, The History of Dunbar, Dunbar, 1830, p. 18.

1246 deaths
Walter
High Stewards of Scotland
Year of birth unknown